Nalini Kanta Bhattasali (24 January 1888 – 6 February 1947) was an Indian Bengali historian, archaeologist, numismatist, epigraphist and antiquarian.

Career

Bhattasali completed his master's degree in 1912. He then joined the Comilla Victoria College as a teacher in history. After that he joined Balurghat High School as its headmaster. In July 1914, he joined Dhaka Museum (later Bangladesh National Museum) as its curator, a position he held until his death in 1947. He wrote reports and research papers on the contribution of important objects to the history and chronology of ancient Bengal. East Bengal (Vanga-Samatata) was his special field of study.

Bhattasali wrote a few books on Bangla literature. A collection of his short stories, "Hashi o Asru" was published in 1915 and his edition of the first book of a unique manuscript of the Krittivasi Ramayan in 1936. He taught Bengali literature, paleography, and history at the University of Dhaka.

References

1888 births
1947 deaths
People from Bikrampur
Bengali writers
Indian numismatists
20th-century Indian historians
Academic staff of the University of Dhaka
Bengali historians